Ivan Abramovich Zalkind (1 May 1885 in Saint Petersburg, Russia – 27 November 1928 in Leningrad, Soviet Union), also known as Ivan Artamonov, was a Jewish Soviet diplomat. Originally a biologist who got his doctorate from the Sorbonne in Paris, Zalkind took part in the October Revolution on the side of Leon Trotsky. When Trotsky 1917 became People's Commissar for Foreign Affairs (de facto: Soviet foreign minister), he made Zalkind his first deputy (de facto: Permanent Under Secretary of State or Deputy Minister of Foreign Affairs). When Trotsky resigned as foreign minister (because of the peace Treaty of Brest-Litovsk), Zalkind was sent as plenipotentiary and consul to Switzerland (Zürich, 1918), Turkey (Istanbul, 1922), Latvia (Liepāja, 1923) and Italy (Genoa, 1924, and Milan, 1925). Back in the Soviet Union, after Trotsky's downfall he was expelled from the Communist party and shot himself.

Sources 

1885 births
1928 suicides
Old Bolsheviks
Trotskyists
Russian anti–World War I activists
Russian biologists
Russian communists
Russian socialists
Russian Marxists
Russian revolutionaries
Jewish socialists
Jewish Soviet politicians
Orthodox Marxists
People of the 1905 Russian Revolution
People of the Russian Revolution
Soviet Trotskyists
Russian Social Democratic Labour Party members
Emigrants from the Russian Empire to the United Kingdom
Emigrants from the Russian Empire to France
Emigrants from the Russian Empire to Spain
Soviet diplomats
Scientists from Saint Petersburg
20th-century biologists
Suicides by firearm in the Soviet Union
Diplomats from Saint Petersburg